The following is a list of Sites of Special Scientific Interest in the Lorne Area of Search. For other areas, see List of SSSIs by Area of Search.

 Airds Park and Coille Nathais
 Allt Broighleachan
 Allt Coire Chailein
 Ard Trilleachan
 Barran Dubh
 Ben Heasgarnich
 Ben Lui
 Bernera Island
 Bonawe To Cadderlie
 Clach Tholl
 Clais Dhearg
 Coille Leitire
 Crannach Wood
 Dalavich Oakwood
 Doire Darach
 Glen Creran Woods
 Glen Nant
 Kennacraig and Esragan Burn
 Lismore Lochs
 Lynn of Lorn Small Islands
 Rannoch Lochs
 Rannoch Moor
 South Kerrera and Gallanach
 South Shian and Balure

 
Lorne